Bengazi is a 1955 American drama film directed by John Brahm and starring Richard Conte, Victor McLaglen, and Richard Carlson. Several adventurers hunt for treasure in the desert near the Libyan town of Benghazi.

Cast

See also
List of American films of 1955

References

External links

http://bengazi.pro

1955 films
1950s adventure drama films
American adventure drama films
Films directed by John Brahm
Films scored by Roy Webb
Films set in Libya
RKO Pictures films
1955 drama films
1950s English-language films
1950s American films
American black-and-white films